Clive Baldock is a British-born Australian professor. He graduated with a BSc (hons) in Physics from the University of Sussex, an MSc in Radiation Physics from St Bartholomew's Hospital Medical College, University of London, a PhD in Medical Physics from King's College London and a Masters of Tertiary Education Management from the University of Melbourne. He also graduated from the University of Oxford Saïd Business School Executive Leadership Programme. His previous roles included Head of the School of Physics at the University of Sydney, Executive Dean of Science at Macquarie University, Executive Director for Physical Sciences, Engineering, Mathematics and Information Sciences at the Australian Research Council (ARC), Dean of Graduate Research and Pro Vice-Chancellor for Researcher Development at the University of Tasmania, and Dean of Graduate Research at the University of Wollongong. He is currently Dean of Graduate Studies and Researcher Development at Western Sydney University. His research interests are in the fields of gel dosimetry, radiation therapy, dosimetry, and medical imaging in which he has published over 170 research journal papers. He has been awarded Fellowships of the Royal Society of New South Wales, the Australian Institute of Physics, the Australasian College of Physical Scientists and Engineers in Medicine, the Institute of Physics (UK) and the Institute of Physics and Engineering in Medicine (UK).

References

External links
Western Sydney University
Scholar

Fellows of the Australian Institute of Physics
Fellows of the Institute of Physics
Academic staff of the University of Sydney
Alumni of King's College London
Living people
Alumni of the University of Sussex
Year of birth missing (living people)
Academic staff of the University of Wollongong
Academic staff of the University of Tasmania